Mystery Ship is a 1941 American film directed by Lew Landers.

Cast
Paul Kelly
Lola Lane
Larry Parks

Production
The film was one of the first Larry Parks made under his contract with Columbia. He came to the studio's attention doubling for Robert Montgomery doing tests for Here Comes Mr Jordan. Filming started 15 May 1941.

References

External links

1941 films
1940s thriller films
American black-and-white films
American spy films
American thriller drama films
Columbia Pictures films
Films directed by Lew Landers
1941 drama films
1940s English-language films
1940s American films